Qeshlaq-e Shakur (also Romanized as Qeshlāq-e Shakūr; also known as Qeshlāq and Qeshlāq-e Shakar) is a village in Nazlu-e Shomali Rural District, Nazlu District, Urmia County, West Azerbaijan Province, Iran. At the 2006 census, its population was 138, in 32 families.

References 

Populated places in Urmia County